Hans Thomas Reiser (born December 19, 1963) is an American computer programmer, entrepreneur, and convicted murderer. In April 2008, Reiser was convicted of the first-degree murder of his wife, Nina Reiser, who disappeared in September 2006. He subsequently pleaded guilty to a reduced charge of second-degree murder, as part of a settlement agreement that included disclosing the location of Nina Reiser's body, which he revealed to be in a shallow grave near the couple's home.

Prior to his incarceration, Reiser created the ReiserFS computer file system, which may be used by the Linux kernel, as well as its attempted successor, Reiser4. In 2004, he founded Namesys, a corporation meant to coordinate the development of both file systems.

Childhood, education, and career
Hans Reiser was born in Oakland, California to Ramon
and Beverly (née Kleiber) Reiser and grew up in the same city. He dropped out of junior high school when he was 13 because of his disdain for what he considered an overly rigid, conventional schooling system, and for constantly being ridiculed and bullied by his peers. Reiser has stated in interviews that, at the age of 15, he was accepted into the University of California, Berkeley. Reiser attended the university off and on until he received a BS in computer science in 1992 at age 28. Although Reiser preferred higher education, he did not pursue a Ph.D. for the same educational reasons for dropping out of junior high school. 

He worked part- to full-time in the computer field while founding the California-based software company Namesys. Before Namesys, Reiser was employed at Synopsys, IBM Research, Premenos Corp., and Accurate Information Systems.

Namesys and ReiserFS

Reiser and his company Namesys developed the journaled computer file systems ReiserFS and Reiser4. ReiserFS has been available in the Linux operating system since version 2.4.1 and has, at times, been the default filesystem on several Linux distributions including, until 2006, Novell's SUSE Linux Enterprise.

Following Reiser's 2006 arrest on suspicion of murder, people in the free software community expressed concern over the future of Reiser's newer filesystem (Reiser4). Jonathan Corbet, editor of LWN.net, argued that the immaturity of Reiser4's feature set and Reiser's extensive combative relationship with the community meant that the filesystem's future had been limited in any event.

Shortly after Reiser's arrest, the employees of Namesys stated that they would continue to work, that the arrest had no immediate effect on the rate of the software's development, and if the case expanded over a longer time, they would seek solutions to ensure the long-term future of the company. On December 21, 2006, Reiser announced that he was selling the company to raise money for his increasing legal fees. According to an interview with Namesys employee Edward Shishkin, as of January 2008, the commercial activity of the company had ceased, but it had not been sold.

Marriage to Nina Sharanova
In 1998, while working in Saint Petersburg, Russia, Reiser reportedly selected a Russian woman from a mail-order bride catalog and arranged to meet her. He subsequently married Nina Sharanova who had joined the other woman on the date with Reiser as an interpreter. Nina was a Russian-born and -trained obstetrician and gynecologist who was studying to become an American licensed OB/GYN. They had two children. 

Hans' father, Ramon, became suspicious of his new daughter-in-law, when she took the title of CFO at Namesys at that time. Ramon was trained in military interviewing techniques and claimed that Nina lied to him when he confronted her about inexplicably-fast-shrinking reserves of Namesys. 

The Reisers separated in May 2004. Nina Reiser filed for divorce three months later, citing irreconcilable differences and alleging that their children "hardly know their father" because he was out of the country on business for most of the year, according to court records. She was granted sole legal custody of the children and shared physical custody of them with her husband. The divorce had not been finalized by the time she disappeared.

Nina Reiser obtained a temporary restraining order against Hans in December 2004 after he pushed her at the height of the divorce proceedings. She dropped the temporary restraining order in late 2005 because the heat of the divorce had chilled over time. In May, Nina Reiser alleged in court filings that her husband had failed to pay 50 percent medical expenses and childcare expenses as ordered by a judge and was in arrears for more than $12,000.

Nina Reiser's murder and disappearance
According to a confession by Hans Reiser to authorities, on September 3, 2006, Nina Reiser dropped their two children off with Hans Reiser at his mother's house, where he was living at the time. The pair got into a heated argument over Nina Reiser taking the children to the doctor's, with Nina referencing that she had custody over the children, and so was free to do as she wished. Defense lawyer William DuBois later said that Hans Reiser alleged that Nina Reiser was fabricating illnesses in the children. In a fit of rage, Hans Reiser hit her in the face and strangled her to death. He put her body into a duffel bag, moved it into his car at night, drove it to an isolated area and buried it over the course of two nights. After cleaning his car, Hans Reiser disposed of the seat the body was placed on out of caution.

Nina Reiser was reported missing on September 5, 2006. She had last been seen on September 3, when she dropped the children off. She failed to meet her best friend at her house later that evening.

Nina Reiser's 2001 Honda Odyssey minivan, with groceries inside, was found on September 9 in Oakland's Thornhill neighborhood, just east of the SR 13 Warren Freeway.
It was reported by police that neighbors first spotted the parked minivan on September 5, the day she was supposed to pick up her children at school.

Hans Reiser's neighbors said that they saw him hosing something down in the driveway for half an hour shortly after Nina went missing and said that his car—a 1988 Honda CR-X Si hatchback—disappeared shortly after, and his mother rented a car so Hans could drive hers. Police brought cadaver dogs in to search his property, but no human remains were found.

Following Nina Reiser's disappearance, which resulted in the removal of the Reiser children from the Reiser family, Hans Reiser attempted to obtain custody but was unsuccessful. Oakland police testified against Hans Reiser at the custody hearing, though they did not reveal the evidence on which they based their concerns.

Murder investigation
Later that month, Oakland police briefly detained Hans Reiser, served him with a search warrant on his person, and obtained a DNA sample. On October 10, 2006, following the second search of his home, Oakland police and Homeland Security Investigations (HSI) investigators removed a number of items. HSI had been investigating Reiser for money laundering. Police announced that they were now treating the disappearance as a homicide case, and Reiser was arrested for the murder of Nina Reiser  and subsequently charged.

On October 11, 2006, law enforcement officials said that blood spatter had been found in Hans Reiser's house and car. Forensic testing (including DNA analysis) could neither confirm nor rule out Nina Reiser as the source of the blood. Officials had not located the missing passenger seat of his car. They also indicated that they had found in the car two books on homicide investigation purchased by Reiser on September 8 — five days after Nina Reiser's disappearance: Homicide: A Year on the Killing Streets by David Simon, and Masterpieces of Murder by Jonathan Goldman. Daniel Horowitz, a high-profile defense attorney, joined the defense team but dropped the case on November 28, citing Reiser's inability to pay for his services. 

Namesys's employees stated that Reiser felt that the police would suspect him from the start. Reiser was arraigned on Thursday, October 12, where he delayed entering a plea until his next court appearance on November 28. He was held without bail. On November 28, Reiser entered a not guilty plea and invoked his right to a speedy trial, forcing the state to schedule a preliminary hearing for December 11.

Trial and conviction

Preliminary hearing

Forensic evidence
The preliminary hearing opened on December 11, 2006, with Reiser being represented by attorney William Du Bois. At the hearing, a forensic technician testified that blood matching Nina Reiser's DNA had been found on a bag in Hans Reiser's car, and on a pillar in his mother (Beverly Palmer)'s home, where he had been living since the separation. It later emerged that a mistake had been made when the police analysed the blood on the pillar, rendering the evidence inconclusive. Police also testified that they had found a 40-piece socket set which may have been used to remove the passenger seat, a receipt for the purchase of the socket set from Kragen Auto Parts, four seat bolts, and a ratchet wrench with a socket on it, suggesting that the seat may have been removed recently. A traffic officer who had pulled Reiser over nine days after Nina Reiser went missing testified later in the trial that the passenger seat had been present at the time, and that he had not seen any blood.

Police surveillance testimony
During the third day of the preliminary hearing, on December 16, 2006, Officer Gino Guerrero stated that Reiser had engaged in a lengthy cat-and-mouse game with surveillance officers who were trailing him on the evening of September 18, 2006. After Reiser left family court in Oakland on the afternoon of September 18, he was trailed by police officers using both cars and an airplane. According to a probable cause statement, Reiser and a male friend "appeared to be conducting countersurveillance" to avoid police by driving at varying speeds, turning down small residential streets, and making abrupt stops.

Reiser and his friend eventually dined at Fonda restaurant in Albany. Afterward, the friend dropped Reiser off at the corner of San Pablo and Ashby avenues in Berkeley. Guerrero said that Reiser walked around the area furtively, occasionally stopping to look in all directions, and eventually got into a 1988 Honda CRX which was parked on Acton Street near Carleton Street.

Reiser's mother, Beverly Palmer, testified that she had been out of town the weekend that Nina Reiser disappeared and was surprised to learn that her son was driving her car, a 2003 Honda Hybrid, and that his Honda CRX was not at the house. Palmer said that when she asked her son where the CRX was, he said it was not working, and "he'd take care of it and I should never mind".

Reiser's son fails to testify
Despite having already testified in December 2006, the Reisers' seven-year-old-son, Rory, was called back to clarify his testimony on January 17, 2007. By the time this order was issued, the Reiser children had been taken to Russia by their maternal grandmother. The grandmother did not act on Judge Julie Conger's request to have the boy return to the hearing.

Prosecutor Greg Dolge stated that Rory did not appear because he was under the care of a therapist in Russia who wanted him to stay in Russia for further treatment. Additionally, the grandmother was occupied with Russian court custody proceedings at the time.

Before her disappearance, Nina Reiser had obtained Russian citizenship for her daughter and son in 2005 and 2006 respectively. William Du Bois proposed an alternative theory of the crime upon learning this and stated that Nina could be alive in Russia.

Closing arguments
Initially, Judge Julie Conger said that on February 23, 2007 she would hold closing arguments and rule on whether there was enough evidence to order Hans Reiser to stand trial. On February 22, 2007, the closing arguments were postponed until March 9 as Reiser's attorney was involved with an unrelated trial that was running longer than expected.

On March 9, the judge ruled that Reiser would stand trial and set Reiser's arraignment for March 23.

Reiser pleads not guilty
On March 23, 2007, Reiser pleaded not guilty before Judge C. Don Clay. Shortly after, the court learned of a complication in the trial regarding a former friend of Hans Reiser named Sean Sturgeon. Sturgeon, who had previously dated Nina Reiser, was claiming to be responsible for eight murders and possibly a ninth. In an interview with Wired News, Sturgeon vigorously denied that Nina Reiser was one of them. With the police doubting that the alleged murders ever took place, Judge Clay issued a gag order against discussing Sturgeon at the trial.

On June 11, Reiser's trial was assigned to Alameda County Superior Court Judge Larry Goodman, who had presided over a number of murder and death penalty cases.

Hearings on pretrial motions
On July 23, 2007, hearings on pretrial motions began. Potential jurors were to be brought to court on August 29, 30, and September 4, to fill out questionnaires, but face-to-face questioning of prospective jurors was not planned to begin until September 19, 2007. Opening statements were expected to begin on October 29, 2007; however, they were postponed and rescheduled for November 5, 2007. The defense stated that the delay was due to possible prejudicial information in a television segment about the case to be aired on November 2. The prosecutor stated that the delay was necessary as more time was needed for additional pretrial motions.

Trial and verdict
Hans Reiser's murder trial began on November 6, 2007 with opening statements from prosecutor Paul Hora. Reiser vigorously denied responsibility for the murder throughout the trial. When Reiser testified in his own defense, his implausible claims and erratic behavior in the courtroom largely undermined his claim of innocence. Psychiatrist Beverly Parr testified that he "possibly" exhibited symptoms of Asperger syndrome but did not make a diagnosis.

On November 13, 2007, Reiser's eight-year-old son, Rory, who had made one out of two planned appearances in the pretrial hearing, arrived from Russia to testify for the prosecution. Both of his grandmothers were ordered out of the courtroom before he took the stand. The prosecution and defense teams both considered the testimony inconsistent, and Du Bois complained that the boy had been coached.

After three days of closing argument, the prosecutor concluded by urging jurors to convict Hans Reiser for murdering his wife. In his closing argument, Reiser's attorney, William Du Bois, urged the jury to consider a sentence of voluntary manslaughter if they believed that Nina was dead and that Hans Reiser killed her in a moment of passion.

On Monday, April 28, 2008, Hans Reiser was found guilty of first degree murder.

Recovery of Nina's body, and sentencing
Prosecutors agreed to a deal whereby Reiser would reveal the location of Nina Reiser's body in exchange for pleading guilty to second-degree murder. The deal was made with the agreement of Nina's family, but it was subject to final approval by Judge Goodman. On Monday, July 7, 2008, Reiser led police to Nina's shallow grave in the Oakland Hills. Oakland homicide detective Lt. Ersie Joyner recalled that Reiser led them directly to the exact site, without any hesitation or confusion. On July 8, the coroner positively identified the skeletal remains as those of Nina Reiser.

On August 29, 2008, Reiser was sentenced to 15 years to life, the maximum sentence for second-degree murder. As a result of his plea bargain, Reiser cannot appeal his conviction or sentence.

Time in prison
On September 5, 2008,  Reiser arrived at San Quentin State Prison to begin his sentence. Reiser tried to appeal his second-degree murder conviction on October 30, 2008. The request was denied by Judge Larry Goodman on November 13, 2008. 

On January 10, 2009, it was reported that Reiser was recovering after having been beaten by several prisoners. On January 28, 2009, he was transferred to Mule Creek State Prison. In February 2011, he was transferred to Pleasant Valley State Prison.  Reiser was housed at the Correctional Training Facility near Soledad, California, with a tentative parole eligibility date of March 2023 after parole was denied in 2020. As of November 2021, he is in the California Health Care Facility.

In September 2011, Hans Reiser filed a civil lawsuit. In his complaint, he named more than 70 defendants, including trial judges and his attorney, William Du Bois. He claimed, among other things, that his attorney had conspired with the judge to file motions against him, which were impossible to appeal, and that his attorney had forced him to take the stand against his will. After several rounds of amendments and additional complaints, the lawsuit was dismissed with prejudice. 

The judges voiced several errors before the dismissal. According to the judges, Reiser's complaint was too long with more than 300 pages in its original form; it listed too many defendants; and the defendants included judges, who have judicial immunity to lawsuits regarding their official conduct. Finally, the judges could not decide whether there was a cause of action (any illegal deed or event, which could be prosecuted) to accept the plea. Reiser argued that he had not received access to the prison law library and that he had been denied the appointment of an attorney to help him formulate his complaint.

In July 2012, a jury awarded Reiser's children $60 million against their father for the death of Nina Reiser. Reiser acted as his own attorney during the trial and tried to argue that he killed his wife to protect their children.

Media portrayals

The Hans Reiser murder case has been covered on a number of true crime television series:
 The series 48 Hours Mystery, episode "Betrayal" (aired December 29, 2008) 
 The series Dominick Dunne's Power, Privilege, and Justice, episode "Programmed for Murder" (aired August 28, 2009)
 The series Behind Mansion Walls, episode "Sex, Money, Death" (aired June 21, 2012)
 The series Final Witness, episode "What the Boy Saw" (aired August 8, 2012)
 The series 20/20 on ID, episode "What Happened to Nina Reiser?" (aired May 19, 2014)

Stephen Elliott's 2009 memoir The Adderall Diaries covers, in part, Elliott's investigation of the Reiser case. The book was adapted as the 2016 film The Adderall Diaries, in which Reiser is portrayed by Christian Slater.

References

External links 

 Hans Reiser's resume 
 The Reiser4 Filesystem: Ways In Which Extra Rigor In Scientific Methodology Can Consume Years Of Your Life, And How The Result Can Be So Very Worthwhile — lecture given by Hans Reiser at Stanford University
 Current filings - for the civil wrongful death lawsuit in the Alameda county courts

1963 births
Living people
Linux kernel programmers
American people convicted of murder
American prisoners sentenced to life imprisonment
Prisoners sentenced to life imprisonment by California
People convicted of murder by California
Murder convictions without a body
American people of German descent
Criminals of the San Francisco Bay Area
Wealth in the United States

People from Oakland, California